The futsal competitions at the 2017 Asian Indoor and Martial Arts Games in Ashgabat took place at the Ice Palace  in Ashgabat.

Medalists

Medal table

Results

Men

First round

Group A

Group B

Group C

Group D

Knockout round

Quarterfinals

Semifinals

Bronze medal match

Gold medal match

Goalscorers

Women

First round

Group A

Group B

Knockout round

Semifinals

Bronze medal match

Gold medal match

Goalscorers

References

External links
  
 futsal planet 
 Results book – Futsal

2017 Asian Indoor and Martial Arts Games events
Asian Indoor and Martial Arts Games
International futsal competitions hosted by Turkmenistan
2017